The Balkan Line is a 2019 Russian–Serbian action film directed by Andrey Volgin, depicting the Russian military's secret operation to capture Slatina Airport in Kosovo after the bombing of Yugoslavia, led by Yunus-bek Yevkurov. These events became the most dangerous aggravation of relations between the Russians and the West since the Cuban Missile Crisis.

The film was released in Russia on 21 March 2019 (three days prior to the 20th anniversary of the events depicted in the film); it was released by 20th Century Fox CIS) after the acquisition of 21st Century Fox by Disney.

Plot 
In 1999, during the bombing of Yugoslavia and the Kosovo War, Slatina airfield is taken over by a UÇK battalion led by an Albanian warlord, Smuk. Afterwards, an operation to capture the airfield from them is conducted by GRU agents. The separatists engage in organ harvesting, robberies, assassinations, and ethnic cleansing.

GRU officer Aslan-Bek Evkhoev and former paratrooper-turned-mercenary Andrey Shatalov head a small detachment tasked with the dangerous mission to stop the Albanians, recapture the airfield held from them, and hold it until Russian Airborne Troops reinforcements stationed in Bosnia arrive ahead of NATO forces, which the team will leave beforehand, as well as rescue Shatalov's love interest Jasna Blagojević, who was captured to be harvested for organs, along with several ethnic Serb prisoners.

Cast 
  as Andrey Shatalov "Shatay"
 Gosha Kutsenko as Aslan-Bek "Bek" Evkhoev (based on Yunus-Bek Yevkurov)
 Miloš Biković as Vuk Majevski, Yugoslav police officer
  as Jasna Blagojević, doctor
 Gojko Mitić as Goran Milić, head of the Yugoslav police station
 Sergey Marin as Ilya Slashchev "Slush"
 Nodari Janelidze as Rustam Mamatgireyev "Girey"
 Kirill Polukhin as Oleg Barmin "Baria", sapper
 Ravshana Kurkova as Vera Kurbaeva, sniper
 Dmitriy Frid as Dr. Stern, doctor from Switzerland, Smuk's accomplice
  as Smuk 
  as Marta, doctor, assistant to Dr. Stern
  as Amir 
 Nikola Randelović as Stevan 
 Roman Kurtsyn as Senior Lieutenant Nikolay Poltoratskiy, platoon commander
 Emir Kusturica as taxi driver (cameo appearance)
 Mikhail Khmurov as General Dmitriy Ivanovich Somov

Production 

The idea of creating a film about the events in Yugoslavia came to Gosha Kutsenko in 2012, during a conversation with a friend, Slovak producer Vasil Shevts. The writer Ivan Naumov was invited to write the script, and he created a 600-page love story of a Russian peacekeeper and a Serbian girl. Kutsenko later met with producer Vadim Byrkin and General Yunus-Bek Yevkurov, who agreed to help him. The real details of the operation in which Yevkurov participated (at that time - the GRU special forces major) are still under the stamp of secrecy, so the scriptwriters thought up the plot at their own discretion, and Yevkurov advised them on the reliability of what was happening.

Casting
Miloš Biković was first offered the role of a Russian soldier, but he refused, deciding that it would be more logical for him to play a Serb in a joint film between Russia and Serbia. However, he immediately agreed to help organize the filming in his homeland and became not only an actor, but also one of the producers of the film.

Milena Radulović (sr) especially for participating in the filming of the film studied Russian and improved it every time, after which she now speaks it with almost no accent.

Emir Kusturica played a small role as a Belgrade taxi driver; According to executive producer Anastasia Pelevina, at first the director had to enter the crew from the Serbian side, but their work schedules did not match.

Filming 
For the filming, all the actors playing the role of special forces went through heavy two-month training which focused on shooting and physical conditioning. 
Location filming took place in Moscow, Moscow Oblast, Russia, Crimea and Serbia.

Release 
The film was released to Russia, Serbia, Kyrgyzstan, Armenia, Belarus and Kazakhstan on March 21, 2019.

References

External links 
 

2019 films
2010s historical action films
2010s Russian-language films
2010s Serbian-language films
Russian action films
Serbian action films
2019 multilingual films
2019 action thriller films
2010s action war films
Russian action thriller films
Russian action war films
Serbian war films
Yugoslav Wars films
Works about the Kosovo War
Films about special forces
Films set in 1995
Russian historical action films
Bosnian War films
Films set in 1999
Action films based on actual events
2010s pregnancy films
Films set in Kosovo
Films set in Belgrade
Films set in Serbia
Films shot in Serbia
Russian multilingual films
Films about terrorism in Europe
Films set in Moscow
Russian films about revenge
Films about mass murder
Historical epic films
Films shot in Moscow
Films shot in Crimea
Films shot in Russia
Films shot in Belgrade
Cultural depictions of Serbian people
Cultural depictions of Russian people
Russian pregnancy films
Serbian pregnancy films
Serbian multilingual films